The finals and the qualifying heats of the men's 400 metre freestyle event at the 1998 World Aquatics Championships were held on Thursday 15 January 1998 in Perth, Western Australia.

Heats

B Final

A Final

See also
Swimming at the 1996 Summer Olympics – Men's 400 metre freestyle (Atlanta)
1997 FINA Short Course World Championships – Men's 400m Freestyle (Gothenburg)
Swimming at the 1997 European Aquatics Championships – Men's 400 metre freestyle (Seville)
Swimming at the 2000 Summer Olympics – Men's 400 metre freestyle (Sydney)

References

Swimming at the 1998 World Aquatics Championships